The Atlas Maior is the final version of Joan Blaeu's atlas, published in Amsterdam between 1662 and 1672, in Latin (11 volumes), French (12 volumes), Dutch (9 volumes), German (10 volumes) and Spanish (10 volumes), containing 594 maps and around 3,000 pages of text. It was the largest and most expensive book published in the seventeenth century. Earlier, much smaller versions, titled Theatrum Orbis Terrarum, sive, Atlas Novus, were published from 1634 onwards. Like Abraham Ortelius's Theatrum Orbis Terrarum (1570), the Atlas Maior is widely considered a masterpiece of the Golden Age of Dutch/Netherlandish cartography (approximately 1570s–1670s).

History
Somewhere around 1604 Willem Blaeu settled down in Amsterdam and opened a shop on the Damrak, where he produced and sold scientific instruments, globes and maps. He was also a publisher, editor and engraver.

In 1629, Willem Blaeu bought the copperplates of several dozens of maps from Jodocus Hondius II's widow. Afterwards, he published an Atlantis Appendix to Mercator's atlas in 1630, containing 60 maps, but no text. The next year a new edition was published, with 98 maps and descriptive text in Latin.

Willem and his son Joan Blaeu made a public announcement in an Amsterdam newspaper that they would publish their own full atlas in 1634. Their first atlas was completed in 1635 and appeared in four different versions: Novus Atlas (German edition, 208 maps in two volumes), Theatrum Orbis Terrarum, sive, Atlas Novus (Latin edition, 207 maps in two volumes; title refers to Ortelius' Theatrum Orbis Terrarum), Toonneel des Aerdrycks (Dutch edition, also 207 maps in two volumes) and finally Theatre du Monde ou Nouvel Atlas (French edition, 208 maps in two volumes (like the German edition)).

After his father's death in 1638, Joan continued to rework and expand the atlas. A three volume edition was published from 1640 onwards. Joan later published the Atlas of England (1648) with maps of John Speed, the Atlas of Scotland (1654) with maps of Timothy Pont and Robert Gordon, and Martino Martini's Novus Atlas Sinensis (Atlas of China, 1655), which were added as respectively the fourth, fifth and sixth volumes of Blaeu's Atlas Novus. 

The final version of the atlas was published as the Atlas Maior and contained 594 maps in eleven (Latin edition: Geographia qvæ est cosmographiæ Blavianæ), twelve (French edition: Le grand atlas ou Cosmographie blaviane, en laquelle est exactement descritte la terre, la mer et le ciel), nine (Dutch edition: Grooten atlas, oft werelt-beschryving, in welcke 't aertryck, de zee en hemel wordt vertoont en beschreven) or ten (German edition) volumes. This final version of the Atlas Maior was the largest and most expansive book published in the seventeenth century.
The first volumes were published in 1662, the last volume was finished in 1665, although Joan continued to rework several volumes. He also started creating a 12 volume Spanish edition, however, only 10 volumes were finished.

However, this 9 to 12 volume atlas was only intended to be the first part of a much larger work, which is illustrated by the full title of the atlas: Atlas Maior, sive Cosmographia Blaviana, qua solum, salum, coelum, accuratissime describuntur (Grand Atlas or Blaeu's Cosmography, in which are most accurately described earth, sea, and heaven). The second part (about the coasts, seas and oceans) and third part (with maps of the skies) were never produced.

In 1672, fire broke out in the workshop. Joan Blaeu died the next year. No new editions of his atlases were published and the family business went bankrupt within a few years.

Literature
General and introductory works:
 Walter A. Goffart, Historical Atlases: The First Three Hundred Years, 1570-1870. University of Chicago Press, 2003, . 
 John Goss & Peter Clark, Blaeu – Der große Atlas: die Welt im 17. Jahrhundert. Wien 1990,  
 J. Keuning, Willem Jansz. Blaeu. A biography and history of his work as a cartographer and publisher. Rev. and ed. by M. Donkersloot-De Vrij. Amsterdam 1973 
 C. Koeman, Joan Blaeu and his 'Grand atlas. Amsterdam 1970. 
 Ute Schneider, Die Macht der Karten. Eine Geschichte der Kartographie vom Mittelalter bis heute. Primus Verlag, 2004, . 
 R. Shirley,  The mapping of the world. Early printed world maps, 1472-1700. London 1983 
 F. Wawrik, Berühmte Atlanten. Kartographische Kunst aus fünf Jahrhunderten. Dortmund 1982 Bibliographical descriptions of the atlases:   Modern reproductions: Joan Blaeu, Le grand atlas ou Cosmographie blaviane, en laquelle est exactement descritte la terre, la mer et le ciel (1663), 12 volumes. The third centenary ed. Amsterdam 1967-1968  

 Taschen editions based on the Atlas Blaeu-Van der Hem of the Österreichische Nationalbibliothek, Vienna: 
   
  
  
  
  
  
  
  
  
  
  
  
  
  

See also

Atlas Blaeu-Van der Hem
Atlas Van Loon
Jan Janssonius
Maris Pacifici
History of cartography
Mappa Mundi
Golden Age of Netherlandish cartography (also known as the Golden Age of Dutch cartography)

Notes

References

External linksDigitized versions:'
 Toonneel des Aerdrycks, ofte Nieuwe Atlas, six volumes (1648-1659), Regionaal Archief Leiden; searchable with high resolution download
 Theatrum Orbis Terrarum, sive Atlas Novus Volume I (1645), University of California, Los Angeles Library; website update in progress (2020) minimal search options
 Novus Atlas, Das ist Weltbeschreibung Volume II (1642), Universitäts- und Landesbibliothek Düsseldorf; download entire document or single page as PDF
 Atlas of Scotland (1654), National Library of Scotland; search, browse, no download
 Geographia Blaviana Amsterdam (1659), de la Biblioteca de la Universidad de Sevilla; no search, high resolution downloads
 J. Blaeus grooten atlas, oft, Werelt-beschryving, in welcke 't aertryck, de zee, en hemel, wordt vertoont en beschreven (1664) 9 volumes, Universiteitsbibliotheek Utrecht; download each volume as PDF, Full text OCR. 

Atlases
1662 books
1665 books
17th-century Dutch books
Memory of the World Register
Cartography in the Dutch Republic